The Sisters of the Holy Names of Jesus and Mary (Soeurs des Saints Noms de Jésus et de Marie) is a teaching religious institute founded at Longueuil, Québec, Canada, in 1843 by  Blessed Mother Marie Rose Durocher for the Christian education of young girls.

Their motto is: "Jésus et Marie, Ma Force et Ma Gloire" ("Jesus and Mary, my strength and my glory").

Since 1843, the SNJM's mission to educate young girls has extended beyond Québec into other Canadian provinces, including Ontario  and Manitoba. Their mission of education also continues internationally, in the United States, Lesotho, and South America.

Within the United States, the sisters have established ministries in California, Oregon, Florida, Mississippi, New York, the Mid-Atlantic states  and Washington among other states.

High schools and universities
High schools (not a complete list)
Academy of the Holy Names (Albany, New York)
Academy of the Holy Names (Tampa, Florida)
Holy Names Academy in Seattle, Washington
Holy Names High School (Oakland, California)
Ramona Convent Secondary School (Alhambra, California)
Saint Monica Catholic High School (Santa Monica, California)
St. Mary's Academy (Portland, Oregon)
St. Mary's Academy (Winnipeg, Manitoba)
St. Andrew's High School (Pasadena, California) (closed - elementary school still in operation, see St. Andrew's Catholic Church (Pasadena, California))
Holy Names High School in Bela Bela, Lesotho
Pensionnat du Saint-Nom-de-Marie in Montreal, Quebec, Canada
http://www.hnmc.org Holy Names Music Center in Spokane, Washington

Universities
Holy Names University in Oakland, California
Marylhurst University near Portland, Oregon (permanently closed in 2018)
Continuing Care Retirement Community
 Mary's Woods

References

External links
 Congregational website
 Sisters of the Holy Names of Jesus and Mary, U.S.-Ontario Province

 
Catholic female orders and societies
Religious organizations established in 1843
Catholic religious institutes established in the 19th century
1843 establishments in Canada